Edward Randolph Welles (January 10, 1830 – October 20, 1888) was the third Bishop of Milwaukee, from 1874 till 1888.

Early life and education
Welles was born on January 20, 1830, in Waterloo, New York, the son of Gardner Welles, a Physician, and Paulina Fuller. He graduated from Hobart college in 1850. He received the degree of Doctor of Sacred Theology from Racine College in 1874.

Ordained ministry
Welles was ordained deacon on December 20, 1857, and served as tutor in De Veaux College. He also served his diaconate at St Paul's Church in Lewiston, Minnesota. He was ordained to the priesthood by William Heathcote DeLancey on September 12, 1858. He then was appointed to organize the parish of Christ Church in Red Wing, Minnesota and became its rector. He retained the post till 1874.

Bishop
He was consecrated as Bishop of Wisconsin on October 25, 1874, in St Thomas' Church, New York City, by Presiding Bishop Benjamin B. Smith. He assumed the title Bishop of Milwaukee in 1886 following the creation of the Episcopal Diocese of Fond du Lac as a separate jurisdiction. He died in office on October 20, 1888.

Welles' primary consecrators were:

Benjamin B. Smith
John Williams (bishop of Connecticut)
Thomas Atkinson (bishop)

He is buried in Red Wing, Minnesota.

References

External links
 Documents by and about Welles from Project Canterbury

1830 births
1888 deaths
People from Waterloo, New York
Hobart and William Smith Colleges alumni
Racine College alumni
19th-century American Episcopalians
Episcopal bishops of Milwaukee
19th-century American clergy